Dease may refer to:

 Dease Strait, a strait in Nunavut, Canada
 Dease Lake (British Columbia), a lake in BC, Canada
 Dease Lake, a town in BC, Canada
 Dease Lake Airport (CYDL), an airport in BC, Canada
 Dease Lake Highway, a highway in BC, Canada
 Dease Creek, a creek in BC, Canada
 Dease River, a river in BC, Canada
 Dease River First Nation, an aboriginal North American community

People with the surname
 Dennis Dease, U.S. Roman Catholic priest
 Elisa Dease (born 1969), U.S. singer
 John Dease (1906–1979), Australian radio personality
 Maurice Dease (1889–1914), British military officer and Victoria Cross holder
 Michael Dease (born 1982), U.S. jazz musician
 Peter Warren Dease (1778–1863), Canadian fur trader
 Pierre Leverne Dease (born 1982), American drag queen known as Nina Bo'nina Brown
 Teresa Ellen Dease (1820–1889), Irish Roman Catholic nun
 Thomas Dease (1578–1651), Irish Roman Catholic bishop
 William Dease (1752–1798), Irish medical doctor

See also

 
 Dea (disambiguation)